This is a list of animated television series first aired in 1992.

Anime television series first aired in 1992

See also
 List of animated feature films of 1992
 List of Japanese animation television series of 1992

References

Television series
1992
1992
Animated series
1992-related lists